Big Neck Records is an independent record label founded and operated by Bart Hart. It was started in Buffalo, New York in 1995 with the release of the first Blowtops and Baseball Furies 7-inch EPs (Voodoo Alley and This Is the World's Greatest Rock & Roll Record, respectively) as an offshoot of The Sanctuary nightclub. Hart opened The Sanctuary in 1995 after abandoning his previous nightclub, Asbury Alley, and it hosted many related bands and performers. Big Neck moved to Washington D.C. The label produces garage, punk, and rockabilly acts.

Roster
 Bart and the Brats
 The Baseball Furies
 The Blowtops
 Concubine Forming
 Fire Heads
 Hollywood
 The Hussy
 Lost Sounds
 The Ponys
 Radio Beats
 Red Red Red
 Stop Worrying and Love the Bomb
 Tractor Sex Fatality
 The Trailerpark Tornados
 The Tyrades
 Sonny Vincent
 Violent Lovers Club
 Wood Chickens

See also 
 List of record labels

External links
 Official site

Music of Buffalo, New York
Companies based in Buffalo, New York
Music companies based in Washington, D.C.
American independent record labels
Garage rock record labels
1995 establishments in New York (state)